Last Desire is the second album of the Italian heavy metal band Mastercastle. The lyrics of the album tell about the concept of "desire". The track "La Serenissima" is a cover of the Italian ensemble Rondo Veneziano.

History
The album was recorded in December 2009 and January 2010 at MusicArt studios (previously called Quakesound). (Genoa, Italy), but the composition began on June. As for the previous album The Phoenix, the producer was Pier Gonella.
In 2012 the label Lion Music released a special version of the album, including 4 bonus tracks:Run Like Hell (Pink Floyd cover)Greedy Blade (instrumental version)Soldier of Fortune (Deep Purple cover), live acoustic versionGreat Hevan's Climb (demo version)

Lyrics
All lyrics were written by Giorgia Gueglio and the album can be considered a concept album about the "desire" theme. Giorgia Gueglio said in a recent interview: "We can consider the album as a concept. There is not a story but every song tells about a different meaning of the word "desire". This word seems so simple but the desire is the main engine of all our thoughts and actions. There is nothing programmed about it. There is something "intriguing", "sensual" and "energetic" in the songs and I did my best to express them with the lyrics"''.

Track listing

Line up
 Giorgia Gueglio – voice
 Pier Gonella – guitars
 Steve Vawamas – bass
 Alessandro Bissa Bix – drums

References

External links
 Mastercastle – Official myspace site of the band

2010 albums
Mastercastle albums